Papyrus 80 (in the Gregory-Aland numbering), designed by 𝔓80, is an early copy of the New Testament in Greek. It is a papyrus manuscript of the Gospel of John. The surviving text of John is verse 3:34. 
The manuscript paleographically had been assigned to the 3rd century.

 Text 
The Greek text of this codex probably is a representative of the Alexandrian text-type, but text is too brief too determine its textual character. 
Aland placed it in Category I (because of its date).

 Location 
It is currently housed at the Fundación Sant Lluc Evangelista (Inv. no. 83) in Barcelona.

See also 

 List of New Testament papyri

References

Further reading 

 R. Roca-Puig, Papiro del evangelio de San Juan con ‘Hermeneia’, in Atti dell’ XI Congresso Internazionale di Papirologia (Milan: 1966), pp. 225–236.

New Testament papyri
3rd-century biblical manuscripts
Early Greek manuscripts of the New Testament
Gospel of John papyri